Patrick McEnroe and Jonathan Stark were the defending champions but only McEnroe competed that year with Richey Reneberg.

McEnroe and Reneberg won in the final 6–3, 7–5 against Alexander Mronz and Lars Rehmann.

Seeds

  Todd Woodbridge /  Mark Woodforde (quarterfinals)
  Grant Connell /  Patrick Galbraith (semifinals)
  Jacco Eltingh /  Paul Haarhuis (semifinals)
  Patrick McEnroe /  Richey Reneberg (champions)

Draw

External links
1993 Ansett Australian Indoor Championships Doubles Draw

Doubles